Mike Burney (1 November 1938 – 13 November 2014) was an English jazz saxophonist, most notable for his tenure in Roy Wood's Wizzard.

Early life
Burney was born in the Great Barr area of Birmingham, and educated at Bromsgrove College of Further Education.

Career
Between 1968 and 1970, Burney was in Billy Fury's backing band.  Following this, he was a member of Wizzard, playing on records such as "I Wish It Could Be Christmas Everyday". He also wrote its b-side, "Rob Roy's Nightmare (A Bit More H.A.)".

More recently, he worked with the Million-Airs Big Band & Concert Orchestra and spent eight years with The Syd Lawrence Orchestra. He also worked on a joint project with other Wizzard members called The Old Horns Band.  He had a residency at Miller & Carter in Sutton Coldfield. He died on 13 November 2014 at the age of 76.

Session and live work
Burney toured, accompanied and sessioned with Chaka Khan, The Beach Boys, Sammy Davis, Jr., Petula Clark, Memphis Slim, Steve Winwood, Ruby Turner, Adam Faith, Bob Hope, Cliff Richard, Cilla Black, Dionne Warwick and Matt Monro; covering a range of blues, jazz and big band genres.

References

External links
Mike Burney Quartet
The Old Horns Band
Roy Wood

1938 births
2014 deaths
English rock saxophonists
English jazz alto saxophonists
English jazz tenor saxophonists
British male saxophonists
Musicians from Birmingham, West Midlands
People from Great Barr
Wizzard members
20th-century saxophonists